Yilan Creole Japanese is a Japanese-based creole of Taiwan. It arose in the 1930s and 1940s, with contact between Japanese colonists and the native Atayal people of southern Yilan County, Taiwan. The vocabulary of a speaker born in 1974 was 70% Japanese and 30% Atayal, but the grammar of the creole does not closely resemble either of the source languages.

It is incomprehensible to both Japanese and Atayal native speakers. The creole was identified in 2006 by Chien Yuehchen and Sanada Shinji, but its existence is still largely unknown. It was named by Sanada and Chien for its location. The official language of Taiwan, Mandarin, threatens the existence of Yilan Creole.

Classification 
Yilan Creole is a creole language that is considered to be part of the Japonic language family. The superstratum and substratum languages of the creole are Japanese and Atayal, respectively. It has possibly been used as the first language among the Atayal and Seediq people since the 1930s.

History 
The island of Taiwan was annexed by Japan under the Shimonoseki Treaty of 1895 until 1945. Control over the island lasted about fifty years. During the latter period of this time, Imperial Japan enforced Taiwanese assimilation to Japanese language and culture. As a result of this contact between the Atayal and Japanese languages, Yilan Creole surfaced. Taiwanese people began attending schools taught in Japanese where all non-Japanese languages were banned, and by 1944 over 77% of Taiwanese were capable in speaking Japanese. Language reforms, name changes, and laws regarding social customs were among the reforms instilled by the Japanese Imperial government. Many are still competent in Japanese today where it is sometimes used as a lingua franca. Although China attempted to rid influence of Japan in Taiwan after the surrender of Japan in 1945, the impact on language and culture in Taiwan is still largely evident.

Atayal features surfaced in the Japanese language spoken in Taiwan, eventually becoming a pidgin before it fully developed into a creole, and the language is now currently the only known Japanese-based creole on the island, and possibly in the world.

Geographic distribution 
The creole is spoken in Yilan County in Eastern Taiwan, mainly in Tungyueh Village, Chinyang Village, Aohua Village, and Hanhsi Village, with evidence of differences varieties of the creole found in each. Although the exact number of Yilan Creole speakers is unknown, it is likely less than the total population of the four villages, which is 3,000. One estimate is that 2,000 to 3,000 speakers of Yilan Creole currently exist. While the creole is currently used among all generations, younger generations are receiving less exposure to it, causing the language to become endangered. While older speakers may not be fluent in Mandarin, younger generations are consistently using Mandarin more.

Japanese language still has some influence in Taiwan society today. Japanese based Internet sites in Japanese are viewed by Taiwanese, with “few other countries [producing] as much information in Japanese as Taiwan”. Evidence of Japanese signboards, particularly with the use of the Japanese hiragana character の (pronounced “no”) may be seen in Taiwan. Taiwanese citizens who received Japanese education during the annexation of the nation still speak Japanese fluently today. There are three generations of Yilan Creole speakers, with the older and middle generations using the creole significantly more than the younger generation.

In Tungyueh Village, younger generations seem to have lost the Yilan Creole, while there are still fluent younger generation speakers of the Creole in Aohua. After a push for preserving a more traditional and pure sense of Atayal heritage, the Yilan Creole that is imbued with Japanese features was removed from language examinations. This further instilled a tendency toward Mandarin and a push away from Yilan Creole in young speakers. While older generations prefer to speak Japanese or Yilan-Creole with people of the same age, they will often use Atayal or Mandarin mixed with Yilan Creole when speaking with younger generations; younger generations will similarly prefer Mandarin with same-age speakers, but may use Yilan Creole with older generations.

Due to the migration of Japanese from the western part of the Japan to Taiwan in the early half of the twentieth century, with seventy percent of Taiwan’s immigrants being from western Japan, Yilan Creole acquired some features of the dialects of western Japan. However, these regional dialects are still used unconsciously.

Phonology

Consonants 
Yilan Creole has the following twenty-two consonants from Japanese and Atayal. The orthography is given in angle brackets where it differs from the IPA symbol.

Japanese consonants that Yilan Creole has inherited include the voiced stops [b], [d] and [g], voiced alveolar fricative [z], alveo-palatal fricative [ɕ], alveolar affricate [ts], and alveo-palatal affricates [tɕ] and [dʑ]. It does not have the bilabial fricative [Φ] and uvular nasal [N] found in Japanese, however.

Atayal consonants the Yilan Creole has inherited include the glottal stop [ʔ], alveolar liquid [l], and velar fricative [x]. It does not have the uvular stop [q] of Atayal. Some other features that Yilan Creole adopted from Atayal are the consonants  [t] and [k] can occur word-finally, velar nasal [ŋ] can appear in the word-initial also word-final position, and fricatives [s], [x] and [h] can occur in word-final position. In some Japanese-based words, [l] has taken place of [r], such as  ‘to sit’ becoming  ‘to sit’ in Yilan Creole. The phoneme [l] similarly does this with [d] in many Japanese based words.

Vowels 
Yilan Creole vowels consist of [a], [i], [u], [e] and [o] which derive from both Japanese and Atayal, but also [ə] which derives specifically from Atayal. However, [u] in Yilan Creole resembles the rounded [u] of Atayal instead of the unrounded [ɯ] in Japanese.

Long consonants and vowels from Japanese words are often shortened in Yilan Creole, where gakkô ‘school’ in Japanese becomes gako ‘school’ in Yilan Creole.

Stress 
Stress in Yilan Creole falls on the final syllable as it does in the Atayal language.

Grammar

Morphology 
Although Yilan Creole verbs derive from Japanese and Atayal, verb conjugation patterns uniquely differ in some aspects. Tense is noted through the use of affixes and temporal adverbs together. Atayal based verbs will still use Japanese affixation. Some processes of negation in Yilan Creole use Japanese derived forms to accommodate the realis mood that is part of Atayal grammar.

Syntax 
The word order of Yilan Creole is SOV. It follows Japanese sentence structure, but there is evidence of Mandarin-based SVO sentences as well, particularly in younger speakers.

Vocabulary 
In Yilan Creole, phonological forms of words are derived from Japanese, while the semantic properties are derived from Atayal. According to a study on Yilan Creole in Tungyueh Village by  Zeitoun, Teng, and Wu, “the proportion of Atayal-derived words in the Yilan Creole basic vocabulary is 18.3%, and that of Japanese-derived words is 35.6%. Both Atayal-derived words and Japanese-derived words can be used for 33.8% of the items”. Mandarin and Southern Min words also exist, but far less. Older generation speakers tend to use Atayal and Japanese variants more often than younger generational speakers, who prefer Mandarin variants, when they exist. Mandarin based words lose their tone in Yilan Creole.

Many Atayal words relating to nature, animals, and plants survived in the creole. Vocabulary of most concepts such as these related to traditional Atayal and Seediq life and culture are retained in Yilan Creole.

Suffixes 
The verb suffix  in Yilan Creole', derived from the Japanese verb ‘to do’, is similar to its Japanese counterpart, except in that it is a bound morpheme while the Japanese  can stand alone as an independent verb. Also, Yilan Creole  can attach to nouns, adjectives, and, among young generational speakers, verbs. However, older generation speakers do not accept verbs + -suru combinations.

Another affix in Yilan Creole is the Japanese derived  for causative forms. However, while Japanese inflection differs between consonant versus vowel ending verbs, the Yilan Creole suffix does not.

Compound words 
There are four types of compound words in Yilan Creole:

 Type 1: Atayal-derived word + Atayal-derived word (e.g., hopa-la’i)
 Type 2: Atayal-derived word + Japanese-derived word (e.g., hopa-tenki)
 Type 3: Japanese-derived word + Atayal-derived word (e.g., naka-lukus, kako-balay)
 Type 4: Japanese-derived word + Japanese-derived word (e.g., naka-pangcyu, unme-zyoto)

While Type 1 compound words occur in Atayal, Japanese does not have occurrences of Type 4 compound words in its own language, suggesting that Type 2, 3, and 4 compound words are creations of Yilan Creole.

Pronouns 
A chart detailing Yilan Creole pronouns:

The forms of pronouns are Japanese derived. However, in comparison to both Atayal and Japanese, Yilan Creole has a simplified pronominal system. The creole distinguishes pronouns between person and number. Yilan does not distinguish between case, bound or free pronouns, nor inclusive versus exclusive pronouns as Atayal does. It also does not distinguish between gender and degree of politeness as Japanese does.

Demonstratives 
Demonstratives in Yilan Creole derive from Japanese.

Adjectives and adverbs 
Adjectives and adverbs in Yilan Creole derive from both Japanese and Atayal. Atayal adjectives are primarily used for colors and subjective feelings. Unlike Japanese, adjectives in the creole languages are not inflected and tense is expressed through temporal adverbs. Adjectives in Yilan Creole may also act as adverbs when modifying verbs. For example, the word lokah ‘good, strong’ “functions as an adjective when describing anta ‘you’ in the phrase lokah anta ‘ you (are) strong’ … while lokah functions as an adverb as in lokah benkyo ‘to study hard’”.

Writing system 
The Latin-based writing system of Yilan creole uses the Kunrei-shiki Romanization, as well as the Atayal writing system used in Taiwan.

References

External links 
Slides on Yilan Creole Japanese 

Japanese-based pidgins and creoles
Languages of Taiwan
Atayalic languages